K07AAD-D, virtual channel 31 (VHF digital channel 7), is a low-power television station licensed to Fort Worth, Texas, United States and serving the Dallas–Fort Worth metroplex. The station is owned by HC2 Holdings. It is not available on either Charter Spectrum, or Verizon FiOS at this time.

History
This station initially began in 1980 (FCC file: BRTT-19800530IG) as K65BC in Mullin, Texas and was owned by Pompey Mountain Broadcasting of Corpus Christi, Texas. Marcos A. Rodriguez acquired the frequency in 1994 and ran Spanish music video programming on it 24 hours a day. KUVN-CA in Fort Worth operated on channel 31 until 2001 when that station moved to channel 47 clearing the way for other use of channel 31. On January 6, 2004, the call sign of K65BC changed to K31GL with the change from channel 65 in Mullin to channel 31 in DeSoto, Texas. During the summer of 2006, the station picked up Almavision.

At one time in the late 1980s, a non-profit organization secured a construction permit for a full-power station on non-commercial channel 31 in Fort Worth that would have broadcast with the call KETE-TV. However, the organization never built the station and the CP was cancelled by the FCC.

In late 2006, Almavision programming ceased on the station and it started airing an all-infomercial format, much like KBOP-LD's current format.

When K31GL switched from analog to digital broadcasting in November 2008, the Genesis network moved from KHPK-LP and KNAV-LP to K31GL, and KHPK-LP began broadcasting K31GL's former infomercial format. In December, DT3 began an all-infomercial format.

On March 12, 2009, DT3 began broadcasting TheCoolTV, a music video channel owned by Cool Music Network. DT3 ceased transmitting TheCoolTV in September 2009, to have been replaced later by a locally originated channel called HOT TV—the "HOT" acronym meant "History of Television"; programming consisted of old movies and TV programs from the 1950s and 1960s. From November 9, 2010 to December 7, 2010, Hot TV became a temporary hub for This TV (previously from WFAA-DT3) before it was moved to its permanent home on KDAF-DT3 and on KDTX-DT3.

On May 19, 2009, DT4 began broadcasting AMGTV. Less than a year later on May 13, 2010, DT4 switched to an affiliate of the Retro Television Network.

On January 7, 2011, DT5 was launched airing infomercials.

In June 2013, K31GL-D was slated to be sold to Landover 5 LLC as part of a larger deal involving 51 other low-power television stations; the sale fell through in June 2016. Mako Communications sold its stations, including K31GL-D, to HC2 Holdings in 2017.

In August 2018, the station went silent, and remained silent during the broadcast frequency repacking process following the 2016-2017 FCC incentive auction, while it constructed its post-repack facility on assigned displacement channel 7.

In February 2020, the station returned to the air with call sign K07AAD-D, broadcasting on assigned displacement channel 7 and moving its community of license to Fort Worth.

Subchannels
The station's signal is multiplexed:

References

External links

Low-power television stations in the United States
Television stations in the Dallas–Fort Worth metroplex
Television channels and stations established in 1980
1980 establishments in Texas
DeSoto, Texas
Innovate Corp.
Classic Reruns TV affiliates